"Do It Like a Robot" is a song released in 2003 by Princess Superstar. This single was released a year after Princess Superstar Is was released and three years after Last of the Great 20th Century Composers, the album in which this song was featured, was released. The remix on the single is done by DJ Hell.

Track listing
 "Do It Like A Robot"
 "Do It Like A Robot (Acapella)"
 "Do It Like A Robot (Hell Rocks the Equalizer Remix)"

Princess Superstar songs
2003 singles
2003 songs
Songs written by Princess Superstar